Surak (also Romanized as Sūrak) is a village in Zarem Rud Rural District, Hezarjarib District, Neka County, Mazandaran Province, Iran. As of the 2006 census, its population was 109 persons separated into 31 families.

References 

Populated places in Neka County